Influenza, commonly known as "the flu", is an infectious disease caused by influenza viruses. Symptoms range from mild to severe and often include fever, runny nose, sore throat, muscle pain, headache, coughing, and fatigue. These symptoms begin from one to four days after exposure to the virus (typically two days) and last for about 2–8 days. Diarrhea and vomiting can occur, particularly in children. Influenza may progress to pneumonia, which can be caused by the virus or by a subsequent bacterial infection. Other complications of infection include acute respiratory distress syndrome, meningitis, encephalitis, and worsening of pre-existing health problems such as asthma and cardiovascular disease.

There are four types of influenza virus, termed influenza viruses A, B, C, and D. Aquatic birds are the primary source of Influenza A virus (IAV), which is also widespread in various mammals, including humans and pigs. Influenza B virus (IBV) and Influenza C virus (ICV) primarily infect humans, and Influenza D virus (IDV) is found in cattle and pigs. IAV and IBV circulate in humans and cause seasonal epidemics, and ICV causes a mild infection, primarily in children. IDV can infect humans but is not known to cause illness. In humans, influenza viruses are primarily transmitted through respiratory droplets produced from coughing and sneezing. Transmission through aerosols and intermediate objects and surfaces contaminated by the virus  also occur.

Frequent hand washing and covering one's mouth and nose when coughing and sneezing reduce transmission. Annual vaccination can help to provide protection against influenza. Influenza viruses, particularly IAV, evolve quickly, so flu vaccines are updated regularly to match which influenza strains are in circulation. Vaccines provide protection against IAV subtypes H1N1 and H3N2 and one or two IBV subtypes. Influenza infection is diagnosed with laboratory methods such as  antibody or antigen tests and a polymerase chain reaction (PCR) to identify viral nucleic acid. The disease can be treated with supportive measures and, in severe cases, with antiviral drugs such as oseltamivir. In healthy individuals, influenza is typically self-limiting and rarely fatal, but it can be deadly in high-risk groups.

In a typical year, 5–15% of the population contracts influenza. There are 3–5 million severe cases annually, with up to 650,000 respiratory-related deaths globally each year. Deaths most commonly occur in high-risk groups, including young children, the elderly, and people with chronic health conditions. In temperate regions of the world, the number of influenza cases peaks during winter, whereas in the tropics influenza can occur year-round. Since the late 1800s, large outbreaks of novel influenza strains that spread globally, called pandemics, have occurred every 10–50 years. Five flu pandemics have occurred since 1900: the Spanish flu in 1918–1920, which was the most severe flu pandemic, the Asian flu in 1957, the Hong Kong flu in 1968, the Russian flu in 1977, and the swine flu pandemic in 2009.

Signs and symptoms

The time between exposure to the virus and development of symptoms, called the incubation period, is 1–4 days, most commonly 1–2 days. Many infections, however, are asymptomatic. The onset of symptoms is sudden, and initial symptoms are predominately non-specific, including fever, chills, headaches, muscle pain or aching, a feeling of discomfort, loss of appetite, lack of energy/fatigue, and confusion. These symptoms are usually accompanied by respiratory symptoms such as a dry cough, sore or dry throat, hoarse voice, and a stuffy or runny nose. Coughing is the most common symptom. Gastrointestinal symptoms may also occur, including nausea, vomiting, diarrhea, and gastroenteritis, especially in children. The standard influenza symptoms typically last for 2–8 days.  A 2021 study suggests influenza can cause long lasting symptoms in a similar way to long COVID.

Symptomatic infections are usually mild and limited to the upper respiratory tract, but progression to pneumonia is relatively common. Pneumonia may be caused by the primary viral infection or by a secondary bacterial infection. Primary pneumonia is characterized by rapid progression of fever, cough, labored breathing, and low oxygen levels that cause bluish skin. It is especially common among those who have an underlying cardiovascular disease such as rheumatic heart disease. Secondary pneumonia typically has a period of improvement in symptoms for 1–3 weeks followed by recurrent fever, sputum production, and fluid buildup in the lungs, but can also occur just a few days after influenza symptoms appear. About a third of primary pneumonia cases are followed by secondary pneumonia, which is most frequently caused by the bacteria Streptococcus pneumoniae and Staphylococcus aureus.

Virology

Types of virus

Influenza viruses comprise four species. Each of the four species is the sole member of its own genus, and the four influenza genera comprise four of the seven genera in the family Orthomyxoviridae. They are:
 Influenza A virus (IAV), genus Alphainfluenzavirus
 Influenza B virus (IBV), genus Betainfluenzavirus
 Influenza C virus (ICV), genus Gammainfluenzavirus
 Influenza D virus (IDV), genus Deltainfluenzavirus

IAV is responsible for most cases of severe illness as well as seasonal epidemics and occasional pandemics. It infects people of all ages but tends to disproportionately cause severe illness in the elderly, the very young, and those who have chronic health issues. Birds are the primary reservoir of IAV, especially aquatic birds such as ducks, geese, shorebirds, and gulls, but the virus also circulates among mammals, including pigs, horses, and marine mammals. IAV is classified into subtypes based on the viral proteins haemagglutinin (H) and neuraminidase (N). As of 2019, 18 H subtypes and 11 N subtypes have been identified. Most potential combinations have been reported in birds, but H17-18 and N10-11 have only been found in bats. Only H subtypes H1-3 and N subtypes N1-2 are known to have circulated in humans. The IAV subtypes in circulation  are H1N1 and H3N2. IAVs can be classified more specifically by natural host species, geographical origin, year of isolation, and strain number, such as H1N1/A/duck/Alberta/35/76.

IBV mainly infects humans but has been identified in seals, horses, dogs, and pigs. IBV does not have subtypes like IAV but has two antigenically distinct lineages, termed the B/Victoria/2/1987-like and B/Yamagata/16/1988-like lineages, or simply (B/)Victoria(-like) and (B/)Yamagata(-like). Both lineages are in circulation in humans, disproportionately affecting children. IBVs contribute to seasonal epidemics alongside IAVs but have never been associated with a pandemic.

ICV, like IBV, is primarily found in humans, though it also has been detected in pigs, feral dogs, dromedary camels, cattle, and dogs. ICV infection primarily affects children and is usually asymptomatic or has mild cold-like symptoms, though more severe symptoms such as gastroenteritis and pneumonia can occur. Unlike IAV and IBV, ICV has not been a major focus of research pertaining to antiviral drugs, vaccines, and other measures against influenza. ICV is subclassified into six genetic/antigenic lineages.

IDV has been isolated from pigs and cattle, the latter being the natural reservoir. Infection has also been observed in humans, horses, dromedary camels, and small ruminants such as goats and sheep. IDV is distantly related to ICV. While cattle workers have occasionally tested positive to prior IDV infection, it is not known to cause disease in humans. ICV and IDV experience a slower rate of antigenic evolution than IAV and IBV. Because of this antigenic stability, relatively few novel lineages emerge.

Genome and structure

Influenza viruses have a negative-sense, single-stranded RNA genome that is segmented. The negative sense of the genome means it can be used as a template to synthesize messenger RNA (mRNA). IAV and IBV have eight genome segments that encode 10 major proteins. ICV and IDV have seven genome segments that encode nine major proteins. Three segments encode three subunits of an RNA-dependent RNA polymerase (RdRp) complex: PB1, a transcriptase, PB2, which recognizes 5' caps, and PA (P3 for ICV and IDV), an endonuclease. The matrix protein (M1) and membrane protein (M2) share a segment, as do the non-structural protein (NS1) and the nuclear export protein (NEP). For IAV and IBV, hemagglutinin (HA) and neuraminidase (NA) are encoded on one segment each, whereas ICV and IDV encode a hemagglutinin-esterase fusion (HEF) protein on one segment that merges the functions of HA and NA. The final genome segment encodes the viral nucleoprotein (NP). Influenza viruses also encode various accessory proteins, such as PB1-F2 and PA-X, that are expressed through alternative open reading frames and which are important in host defense suppression, virulence, and pathogenicity.

The virus particle, called a virion, is pleomorphic and varies between being filamentous, bacilliform, or spherical in shape. Clinical isolates tend to be pleomorphic, whereas strains adapted to laboratory growth typically produce spherical virions. Filamentous virions are about 250 nanometers (nm) by 80 nm, bacilliform 120–250 by 95 nm, and spherical 120 nm in diameter. The virion consists of each segment of the genome bound to nucleoproteins in separate ribonucleoprotein (RNP) complexes for each segment, all of which are surrounded by a lipid bilayer membrane called the viral envelope. There is a copy of the RdRp, all subunits included, bound to each RNP. The envelope is reinforced structurally by matrix proteins on the interior that enclose the RNPs, and the envelope contains HA and NA (or HEF) proteins extending outward from the exterior surface of the envelope. HA and HEF proteins have a distinct "head" and "stalk" structure. M2 proteins form proton ion channels through the viral envelope that are required for viral entry and exit. IBVs contain a surface protein named NB that is anchored in the envelope, but its function is unknown.

Life cycle

The viral life cycle begins by binding to a target cell. Binding is mediated by the viral HA proteins on the surface of the envelope, which bind to cells that contain sialic acid receptors on the surface of the cell membrane. For N1 subtypes with the "G147R" mutation and N2 subtypes, the NA protein can initiate entry. Prior to binding, NA proteins promote access to target cells by degrading mucus, which helps to remove extracellular decoy receptors that would impede access to target cells. After binding, the virus is internalized into the cell by an endosome that contains the virion inside it. The endosome is acidified by cellular vATPase to have lower pH, which triggers a conformational change in HA that allows fusion of the viral envelope with the endosomal membrane. At the same time, hydrogen ions diffuse into the virion through M2 ion channels, disrupting internal protein-protein interactions to release RNPs into the host cell's cytosol. The M1 protein shell surrounding RNPs is degraded, fully uncoating RNPs in the cytosol.

RNPs are then imported into the nucleus with the help of viral localization signals. There, the viral RNA polymerase transcribes mRNA using the genomic negative-sense strand as a template. The polymerase snatches 5' caps for viral mRNA from cellular RNA to prime mRNA synthesis and the 3'-end of mRNA is polyadenylated at the end of transcription. Once viral mRNA is transcribed, it is exported out of the nucleus and translated by host ribosomes in a cap-dependent manner to synthesize viral proteins. RdRp also synthesizes complementary positive-sense strands of the viral genome in a complementary RNP complex which are then used as templates by viral polymerases to synthesize copies of the negative-sense genome. During these processes, RdRps of avian influenza viruses (AIVs) function optimally at a higher temperature than mammalian influenza viruses.

Newly synthesized viral polymerase subunits and NP proteins are imported to the nucleus to further increase the rate of viral replication and form RNPs. HA, NA, and M2 proteins are trafficked with the aid of M1 and NEP proteins to the cell membrane through the Golgi apparatus and inserted into the cell's membrane. Viral non-structural proteins including NS1, PB1-F2, and PA-X regulate host cellular processes to disable antiviral responses. PB1-F2 aso interacts with PB1 to keep polymerases in the nucleus longer. M1 and NEP proteins localize to the nucleus during the later stages of infection, bind to viral RNPs and mediate their export to the cytoplasm where they migrate to the cell membrane with the aid of recycled endosomes and are bundled into the segments of the genome.

Progeny viruses leave the cell by budding from the cell membrane, which is initiated by the accumulation of M1 proteins at the cytoplasmic side of the membrane. The viral genome is incorporated inside a viral envelope derived from portions of the cell membrane that have HA, NA, and M2 proteins. At the end of budding, HA proteins remain attached to cellular sialic acid until they are cleaved by the sialidase activity of NA proteins. The virion is then released from the cell. The sialidase activity of NA also cleaves any sialic acid residues from the viral surface, which helps prevent newly assembled viruses from aggregating near the cell surface and improving infectivity. Similar to other aspects of influenza replication, optimal NA activity is temperature- and pH-dependent. Ultimately, presence of large quantities of viral RNA in the cell triggers apoptosis, i.e. programmed cell death, which is initiated by cellular factors to restrict viral replication.

Antigenic drift and shift

Two key processes that influenza viruses evolve through are antigenic drift and antigenic shift. Antigenic drift is when an influenza virus's antigens change due to the gradual accumulation of mutations in the antigen's (HA or NA) gene. This can occur in response to evolutionary pressure exerted by the host immune response. Antigenic drift is especially common for the HA protein, in which just a few amino acid changes in the head region can constitute antigenic drift. The result is the production of novel strains that can evade pre-existing antibody-mediated immunity. Antigenic drift occurs in all influenza species but is slower in B than A and slowest in C and D. Antigenic drift is a major cause of seasonal influenza, and requires that flu vaccines be updated annually. HA is the main component of inactivated vaccines, so surveillance monitors antigenic drift of this antigen among circulating strains. Antigenic evolution of influenza viruses of humans appears to be faster than influenza viruses in swine and equines. In wild birds, within-subtype antigenic variation appears to be limited but has been observed in poultry.

Antigenic shift is a sudden, drastic change in an influenza virus's antigen, usually HA. During antigenic shift, antigenically different strains that infect the same cell can reassort genome segments with each other, producing hybrid progeny. Since all influenza viruses have segmented genomes, all are capable of reassortment. Antigenic shift, however, only occurs among influenza viruses of the same genus and most commonly occurs among IAVs. In particular, reassortment is very common in AIVs, creating a large diversity of influenza viruses in birds, but is uncommon in human, equine, and canine lineages. Pigs, bats, and quails have receptors for both mammalian and avian IAVs, so they are potential "mixing vessels" for reassortment. If an animal strain reassorts with a human strain, then a novel strain can emerge that is capable of human-to-human transmission. This has caused pandemics, but only a limited number have occurred, so it is difficult to predict when the next will happen.

Mechanism

Transmission
People who are infected can transmit influenza viruses through breathing, talking, coughing, and sneezing, which spread respiratory droplets and aerosols that contain virus particles into the air. A person susceptible to infection can then contract influenza by coming into contact with these particles. Respiratory droplets are relatively large and travel less than two meters before falling onto nearby surfaces. Aerosols are smaller and remain suspended in the air longer, so they take longer to settle and can travel further than respiratory droplets. Inhalation of aerosols can lead to infection, but most transmission is in the area about two meters around an infected person via respiratory droplets that come into contact with mucosa of the upper respiratory tract. Transmission through contact with a person, bodily fluids, or intermediate objects (fomites) can also occur, such as through contaminated hands and surfaces since influenza viruses can survive for hours on non-porous surfaces. If one's hands are contaminated, then touching one's face can cause infection.

Influenza is usually transmissible from one day before the onset of symptoms to 5–7 days after. In healthy adults, the virus is shed for up to 3–5 days. In children and the immunocompromised, the virus may be transmissible for several weeks. Children ages 2–17 are considered to be the primary and most efficient spreaders of influenza. Children who have not had multiple prior exposures to influenza viruses shed the virus at greater quantities and for a longer duration than other children. People who are at risk of exposure to influenza include health care workers, social care workers, and those who live with or care for people vulnerable to influenza. In long-term care facilities, the flu can spread rapidly after it is introduced. A variety of factors likely encourage influenza transmission, including lower temperature, lower absolute and relative humidity, less ultraviolet radiation from the Sun, and crowding. Influenza viruses that infect the upper respiratory tract like H1N1 tend to be more mild but more transmissible, whereas those that infect the lower respiratory tract like H5N1 tend to cause more severe illness but are less contagious.

Pathophysiology

In humans, influenza viruses first cause infection by infecting epithelial cells in the respiratory tract. Illness during infection is primarily the result of lung inflammation and compromise caused by epithelial cell infection and death, combined with inflammation caused by the immune system's response to infection. Non-respiratory organs can become involved, but the mechanisms by which influenza is involved in these cases are unknown. Severe respiratory illness can be caused by multiple, non-exclusive mechanisms, including obstruction of the airways, loss of alveolar structure, loss of lung epithelial integrity due to epithelial cell infection and death, and degradation of the extracellular matrix that maintains lung structure. In particular, alveolar cell infection appears to drive severe symptoms since this results in impaired gas exchange and enables viruses to infect endothelial cells, which produce large quantities of pro-inflammatory cytokines.

Pneumonia caused by influenza viruses is characterized by high levels of viral replication in the lower respiratory tract, accompanied by a strong pro-inflammatory response called a cytokine storm. Infection with H5N1 or H7N9 especially produces high levels of pro-inflammatory cytokines. In bacterial infections, early depletion of macrophages during influenza creates a favorable environment in the lungs for bacterial growth since these white blood cells are important in responding to bacterial infection. Host mechanisms to encourage tissue repair may inadvertently allow bacterial infection. Infection also induces production of systemic glucocorticoids that can reduce inflammation to preserve tissue integrity but allow increased bacterial growth.

The pathophysiology of influenza is significantly influenced by which receptors influenza viruses bind to during entry into cells. Mammalian influenza viruses preferentially bind to sialic acids connected to the rest of the oligosaccharide by an α-2,6 link, most commonly found in various respiratory cells, such as respiratory and retinal epithelial cells. AIVs prefer sialic acids with an α-2,3 linkage, which are most common in birds in gastrointestinal epithelial cells and in humans in the lower respiratory tract. Furthermore, cleavage of the HA protein into HA, the binding subunit, and HA, the fusion subunit, is performed by different proteases, affecting which cells can be infected. For mammalian influenza viruses and low pathogenic AIVs, cleavage is extracellular, which limits infection to cells that have the appropriate proteases, whereas for highly pathogenic AIVs, cleavage is intracellular and performed by ubiquitous proteases, which allows for infection of a greater variety of cells, thereby contributing to more severe disease.

Immunology
Cells possess sensors to detect viral RNA, which can then induce interferon production. Interferons mediate expression of antiviral proteins and proteins that recruit immune cells to the infection site, and they also notify nearby uninfected cells of infection. Some infected cells release pro-inflammatory cytokines that recruit immune cells to the site of infection. Immune cells control viral infection by killing infected cells and phagocytizing viral particles and apoptotic cells. An exacerbated immune response, however, can harm the host organism through a cytokine storm. To counter the immune response, influenza viruses encode various non-structural proteins, including NS1, NEP, PB1-F2, and PA-X, that are involved in curtailing the host immune response by suppressing interferon production and host gene expression.

B cells, a type of white blood cell, produce antibodies that bind to influenza antigens HA and NA (or HEF) and other proteins to a lesser degree. Once bound to these proteins, antibodies block virions from binding to cellular receptors, neutralizing the virus. In humans, a sizeable antibody response occurs ~1 week after viral exposure. This antibody response is typically robust and long-lasting, especially for ICV and IDV. In other words, people exposed to a certain strain in childhood still possess antibodies to that strain at a reasonable level later in life, which can provide some protection to related strains. There is, however, an "original antigenic sin", in which the first HA subtype a person is exposed to influences the antibody-based immune response to future infections and vaccines.

Prevention

Vaccination

Annual vaccination is the primary and most effective way to prevent influenza and influenza-associated complications, especially for high-risk groups. Vaccines against the flu are trivalent or quadrivalent, providing protection against an H1N1 strain, an H3N2 strain, and one or two IBV strains corresponding to the two IBV lineages. Two types of vaccines are in use: inactivated vaccines that contain "killed" (i.e. inactivated) viruses and live attenuated influenza vaccines (LAIVs) that contain weakened viruses. There are three types of inactivated vaccines: whole virus, split virus, in which the virus is disrupted by a detergent, and subunit, which only contains the viral antigens HA and NA. Most flu vaccines are inactivated and administered via intramuscular injection. LAIVs are sprayed into the nasal cavity.

Vaccination recommendations vary by country. Some recommend vaccination for all people above a certain age, such as 6 months, whereas other countries recommendation is limited for high at risk groups, such as pregnant women, young children (excluding newborns), the elderly, people with chronic medical conditions, health care workers, people who come into contact with high-risk people, and people who transmit the virus easily. Young infants cannot receive flu vaccines for safety reasons, but they can inherit passive immunity from their mother if inactivated vaccines are administered to the mother during pregnancy. Influenza vaccination also helps to reduce the probability of reassortment.

In general, influenza vaccines are only effective if there is an antigenic match between vaccine strains and circulating strains. Additionally, most commercially available flu vaccines are manufactured by propagation of influenza viruses in embryonated chicken eggs, taking 6–8 months. Flu seasons are different in the northern and southern hemisphere, so the WHO meets twice a year, one for each hemisphere, to discuss which strains should be included in flu vaccines based on observation from HA inhibition assays. Other manufacturing methods include an MDCK cell culture-based inactivated vaccine and a recombinant subunit vaccine manufactured from baculovirus overexpression in insect cells.

Antiviral chemoprophylaxis
Influenza can be prevented or reduced in severity by post-exposure prophylaxis with the antiviral drugs oseltamivir, which can be taken orally by those at least three months old, and zanamivir, which can be inhaled by those above seven years of age. Chemoprophylaxis is most useful for individuals at high-risk of developing complications and those who cannot receive the flu vaccine due to contraindications or lack of effectiveness. Post-exposure chemoprophylaxis is only recommended if oseltamivir is taken within 48 hours of contact with a confirmed or suspected influenza case and zanamivir within 36 hours. It is recommended that it be offered to people who have yet to receive a vaccine for the current flu season, who have been vaccinated less than two week since contact, if there is a significant mismatch between vaccine and circulating strains, or during an outbreak in a closed setting regardless of vaccination history.

Infection control
Hand hygiene is important in reducing the spread of influenza. This includes frequent hand washing with soap and water, using alcohol-based hand sanitizers, and not touching one's eyes, nose, and mouth with one's hands. Covering one's nose and mouth when coughing or sneezing is important. Other methods to limit influenza transmission include staying home when sick, avoiding contact with others until one day after symptoms end, and disinfecting surfaces likely to be contaminated by the virus, such as doorknobs. Health education through media and posters is often used to remind people of the aforementioned etiquette and hygiene.

There is uncertainty about the use of masks since research thus far has not shown a significant reduction in seasonal influenza with mask usage. Likewise, the effectiveness of screening at points of entry into countries is not well researched. Social distancing measures such as school closures, avoiding contact with infected people via isolation or quarantine, and limiting mass gatherings may reduce transmission, but these measures are often expensive, unpopular, and difficult to implement. Consequently, the commonly recommended methods of infection control are respiratory etiquette, hand hygiene, and mask wearing, which are inexpensive and easy to perform. Pharmaceutical measures are effective but may not be available in the early stages of an outbreak.

In health care settings, infected individuals may be cohorted or assigned to individual rooms. Protective clothing such as masks, gloves, and gowns is recommended when coming into contact with infected individuals if there is a risk of exposure to infected bodily fluids. Keeping patients in negative pressure rooms and avoiding aerosol-producing activities may help, but special air handling and ventilation systems are not considered necessary to prevent the spread of influenza in the air. In residential homes, new admissions may need to be closed until the spread of influenza is controlled. When discharging patients to care homes, it is important to take care if there is a known influenza outbreak.

Since influenza viruses circulate in animals such as birds and pigs, prevention of transmission from these animals is important. Water treatment, indoor raising of animals, quarantining sick animals, vaccination, and biosecurity are the primary measures used. Placing poultry houses and piggeries on high ground away from high-density farms, backyard farms, live poultry markets, and bodies of water helps to minimize contact with wild birds. Closure of live poultry markets appears to the most effective measure and has shown to be effective at controlling the spread of H5N1, H7N9, and H9N2. Other biosecurity measures include cleaning and disinfecting facilities and vehicles, banning visits to poultry farms, not bringing birds intended for slaughter back to farms, changing clothes, disinfecting foot baths, and treating food and water.

If live poultry markets are not closed, then "clean days" when unsold poultry is removed and facilities are disinfected and "no carry-over" policies to eliminate infectious material before new poultry arrive can be used to reduce the spread of influenza viruses. If a novel influenza viruses has breached the aforementioned biosecurity measures, then rapid detection to stamp it out via quarantining, decontamination, and culling may be necessary to prevent the virus from becoming endemic. Vaccines exist for avian H5, H7, and H9 subtypes that are used in some countries. In China, for example, vaccination of domestic birds against H7N9 successfully limited its spread, indicating that vaccination may be an effective strategy if used in combination with other measures to limit transmission. In pigs and horses, management of influenza is dependent on vaccination with biosecurity.

Diagnosis

Diagnosis based on symptoms is fairly accurate in otherwise healthy people during seasonal epidemics and should be suspected in cases of pneumonia, acute respiratory distress syndrome (ARDS), sepsis, or if encephalitis, myocarditis, or breaking down of muscle tissue occur. Because influenza is similar to other viral respiratory tract illnesses, laboratory diagnosis is necessary for confirmation. Common ways of collecting samples for testing include nasal and throat swabs. Samples may be taken from the lower respiratory tract if infection has cleared the upper but not lower respiratory tract. Influenza testing is recommended for anyone hospitalized with symptoms resembling influenza during flu season or who is connected to an influenza case. For severe cases, earlier diagnosis improves patient outcome. Diagnostic methods that can identify influenza include viral cultures, antibody- and antigen-detecting tests, and nucleic acid-based tests.

Viruses can be grown in a culture of mammalian cells or embryonated eggs for 3–10 days to monitor cytopathic effect. Final confirmation can then be done via antibody staining, hemadsorption using red blood cells, or immunofluorescence microscopy. Shell vial cultures, which can identify infection via immunostaining before a cytopathic effect appears, are more sensitive than traditional cultures with results in 1–3 days. Cultures can be used to characterize novel viruses, observe sensitivity to antiviral drugs, and monitor antigenic drift, but they are relatively slow and require specialized skills and equipment.

Serological assays can be used to detect an antibody response to influenza after natural infection or vaccination. Common serological assays include hemagglutination inhibition assays that detect HA-specific antibodies, virus neutralization assays that check whether antibodies have neutralized the virus, and enzyme-linked immunoabsorbant assays. These methods tend to be relatively inexpensive and fast but are less reliable than nucleic-acid based tests.

Direct fluorescent or immunofluorescent antibody (DFA/IFA) tests involve staining respiratory epithelial cells in samples with fluorescently-labeled influenza-specific antibodies, followed by examination under a fluorescent microscope. They can differentiate between IAV and IBV but can't subtype IAV. Rapid influenza diagnostic tests (RIDTs) are a simple way of obtaining assay results, are low cost, and produce results quickly, at less than 30 minutes, so they are commonly used, but they can't distinguish between IAV and IBV or between IAV subtypes and are not as sensitive as nucleic-acid based tests.

Nucleic acid-based tests (NATs) amplify and detect viral nucleic acid. Most of these tests take a few hours, but rapid molecular assays are as fast as RIDTs. Among NATs, reverse transcription polymerase chain reaction (RT-PCR) is the most traditional and considered the gold standard for diagnosing influenza because it is fast and can subtype IAV, but it is relatively expensive and more prone to false-positives than cultures. Other NATs that have been used include loop-mediated isothermal amplification-based assays, simple amplification-based assays, and nucleic acid sequence-based amplification. Nucleic acid sequencing methods can identify infection by obtaining the nucleic acid sequence of viral samples to identify the virus and antiviral drug resistance. The traditional method is Sanger sequencing, but it has been largely replaced by next-generation methods that have greater sequencing speed and throughput.

Treatment

Treatment of influenza in cases of mild or moderate illness is supportive and includes anti-fever medications such as acetaminophen and ibuprofen, adequate fluid intake to avoid dehydration, and resting at home. Cough drops and throat sprays may be beneficial for sore throat. It is recommended to avoid alcohol and tobacco use while sick with the flu. Aspirin is not recommended to treat influenza in children due to an elevated risk of developing Reye syndrome. Corticosteroids likewise are not recommended except when treating septic shock or an underlying medical condition, such as chronic obstructive pulmonary disease or asthma exacerbation, since they are associated with increased mortality. If a secondary bacterial infection occurs, then treatment with antibiotics may be necessary.

Antivirals

Antiviral drugs are primarily used to treat severely ill patients, especially those with compromised immune systems. Antivirals are most effective when started in the first 48 hours after symptoms appear. Later administration may still be beneficial for those who have underlying immune defects, those with more severe symptoms, or those who have a higher risk of developing complications if these individuals are still shedding the virus. Antiviral treatment is also recommended if a person is hospitalized with suspected influenza instead of waiting for test results to return and if symptoms are worsening. Most antiviral drugs against influenza fall into two categories: neuraminidase (NA) inhibitors and M2 inhibitors. Baloxavir marboxil is a notable exception, which targets the endonuclease activity of the viral RNA polymerase and can be used as an alternative to NA and M2 inhibitors for IAV and IBV.

NA inhibitors target the enzymatic activity of NA receptors, mimicking the binding of sialic acid in the active site of NA on IAV and IBV virions so that viral release from infected cells and the rate of viral replication are impaired. NA inhibitors include oseltamivir, which is consumed orally in a prodrug form and converted to its active form in the liver, and zanamivir, which is a powder that is inhaled nasally. Oseltamivir and zanamivir are effective for prophylaxis and post-exposure prophylaxis, and research overall indicates that NA inhibitors are effective at reducing rates of complications, hospitalization, and mortality and the duration of illness. Additionally, the earlier NA inhibitors are provided, the better the outcome, though late administration can still be beneficial in severe cases. Other NA inhibitors include laninamivir and peramivir, the latter of which can be used as an alternative to oseltamivir for people who cannot tolerate or absorb it.

The adamantanes amantadine and rimantadine are orally administered drugs that block the influenza virus's M2 ion channel, preventing viral uncoating. These drugs are only functional against IAV but are no longer recommended for use because of widespread resistance to them among IAVs. Adamantane resistance first emerged in H3N2 in 2003, becoming worldwide by 2008. Oseltamivir resistance is no longer widespread because the 2009 pandemic H1N1 strain (H1N1 pdm09), which is resistant to adamantanes, seemingly replaced resistant strains in circulation. Since the 2009 pandemic, oseltamivir resistance has mainly been observed in patients undergoing therapy, especially the immunocompromised and young children. Oseltamivir resistance is usually reported in H1N1, but has been reported in H3N2 and IBVs less commonly. Because of this, oseltamivir is recommended as the first drug of choice for immunocompetent people, whereas for the immunocompromised, oseltamivir is recommended against H3N2 and IBV and zanamivir against H1N1 pdm09. Zanamivir resistance is observed less frequently, and resistance to peramivir and baloxavir marboxil is possible.

Prognosis
In healthy individuals, influenza infection is usually self-limiting and rarely fatal. Symptoms usually last for 2–8 days. Influenza can cause people to miss work or school, and it is associated with decreased job performance and, in older adults, reduced independence. Fatigue and malaise may last for several weeks after recovery, and healthy adults may experience pulmonary abnormalities that can take several weeks to resolve. Complications and mortality primarily occur in high-risk populations and those who are hospitalized. Severe disease and mortality are usually attributable to pneumonia from the primary viral infection or a secondary bacterial infection, which can progress to ARDS.

Other respiratory complications that may occur include sinusitis, bronchitis, bronchiolitis, excess fluid buildup in the lungs, and exacerbation of chronic bronchitis and asthma. Middle ear infection and croup may occur, most commonly in children. Secondary S. aureus infection has been observed, primarily in children, to cause toxic shock syndrome after influenza, with hypotension, fever, and reddening and peeling of the skin. Complications affecting the cardiovascular system are rare and include pericarditis, fulminant myocarditis with a fast, slow, or irregular heartbeat, and exacerbation of pre-existing cardiovascular disease. Inflammation or swelling of muscles accompanied by muscle tissue breaking down occurs rarely, usually in children, which presents as extreme tenderness and muscle pain in the legs and a reluctance to walk for 2–3 days.

Influenza can affect pregnancy, including causing smaller neonatal size, increased risk of premature birth, and an increased risk of child death shortly before or after birth. Neurological complications have been associated with influenza on rare occasions, including aseptic meningitis, encephalitis, disseminated encephalomyelitis, transverse myelitis, and Guillain–Barré syndrome. Additionally, febrile seizures and Reye syndrome can occur, most commonly in children. Influenza-associated encephalopathy can occur directly from central nervous system infection from the presence of the virus in blood and presents as suddent onset of fever with convulsions, followed by rapid progression to coma. An atypical form of encephalitis called encephalitis lethargica, characterized by headache, drowsiness, and coma, may rarely occur sometime after infection. In survivors of influenza-associated encephalopathy, neurological defects may occur. Primarily in children, in severe cases the immune system may rarely dramatically overproduce white blood cells that release cytokines, causing severe inflammation.

People who are at least 65 years of age, due to a weakened immune system from aging or a chronic illness, are a high-risk group for developing complications, as are children less than one year of age and children who have not been previously exposed to influenza viruses multiple times. Pregnant women are at an elevated risk, which increases by trimester and lasts up to two weeks after childbirth. Obesity, in particular a body mass index greater than 35–40, is associated with greater amounts of viral replication, increased severity of secondary bacterial infection, and reduced vaccination efficacy. People who have underlying health conditions are also considered at-risk, including those who have congenital or chronic heart problems or lung (e.g. asthma), kidney, liver, blood, neurological, or metabolic (e.g. diabetes) disorders, as are people who are immunocompromised from chemotherapy, asplenia, prolonged steroid treatment, splenic dysfunction, or HIV infection. Tobacco use, including past use, places a person at risk. The role of genetics in influenza is not well researched, but it may be a factor in influenza mortality.

Epidemiology

Influenza is typically characterized by seasonal epidemics and sporadic pandemics. Most of the burden of influenza is a result of flu seasons caused by IAV and IBV. Among IAV subtypes, H1N1 and H3N2 circulate in humans and are responsible for seasonal influenza. Cases disproportionately occur in children, but most severe causes are among the elderly, the very young, and the immunocompromised. In a typical year, influenza viruses infect 5–15% of the global population, causing 3–5 million cases of severe illness annually and accounting for 290,000–650,000 deaths each year due to respiratory illness. 5–10% of adults and 20–30% of children contract influenza each year. The reported number of influenza cases is usually much lower than the actual number of cases.

During seasonal epidemics, it is estimated that about 80% of otherwise healthy people who have a cough or sore throat have the flu. Approximately 30–40% of people hospitalized for influenza develop pneumonia, and about 5% of all severe pneumonia cases in hospitals are due to influenza, which is also the most common cause of ARDS in adults. In children, influenza is one of the two most common causes of ARDS, the other being the respiratory syncytial virus. About 3–5% of children each year develop otitis media due to influenza. Adults who develop organ failure from influenza and children who have PIM scores and acute renal failure have higher rates of mortality. During seasonal influenza, mortality is concentrated in the very young and the elderly, whereas during flu pandemics, young adults are often affected at a high rate.

In temperate regions, the number of influenza cases varies from season to season. Lower vitamin D levels, presumably due to less sunlight, lower humidity, lower temperature, and minor changes in virus proteins caused by antigenic drift contribute to annual epidemics that peak during the winter season. In the northern hemisphere, this is from October to May (more narrowly December to April), and in the southern hemisphere, this is from May to October (more narrowly June to September). There are therefore two distinct influenza seasons every year in temperate regions, one in the northern hemisphere and one in the southern hemisphere.  In tropical and subtropical regions, seasonality is more complex and appears to be affected by various climatic factors such as minimum temperature, hours of sunshine, maximum rainfall, and high humidity. Influenza may therefore occur year-round in these regions. Influenza epidemics in modern times have the tendency to start in the eastern or southern hemisphere, with Asia being a key reservoir of influenza viruses.

IAV and IBV co-circulate, so the two have the same patterns of transmission. The seasonality of ICV, however, is poorly understood. ICV infection is most common in children under the age of 2, and by adulthood most people have been exposed to it. ICV-associated hospitalization most commonly occurs in children under the age of 3 and is frequently accompanied by co-infection with another virus or a bacterium, which may increase the severity of disease. When considering all hospitalizations for respiratory illness among young children, ICV appears to account for only a small percentage of such cases. Large outbreaks of ICV infection can occur, so incidence varies significantly.

Outbreaks of influenza caused by novel influenza viruses are common. Depending on the level of pre-existing immunity in the population, novel influenza viruses can spread rapidly and cause pandemics with millions of deaths. These pandemics, in contrast to seasonal influenza, are caused by antigenic shifts involving animal influenza viruses. To date, all known flu pandemics have been caused by IAVs, and they follow the same pattern of spreading from an origin point to the rest of the world over the course of multiple waves in a year. Pandemic strains tend to be associated with higher rates of pneumonia in otherwise healthy individuals. Generally after each influenza pandemic, the pandemic strain continues to circulate as the cause of seasonal influenza, replacing prior strains. From 1700 to 1889, influenza pandemics occurred about once every 50–60 years. Since then, pandemics have occurred about once every 10–50 years, so they may be getting more frequent over time.

History

It is impossible to know when an influenza virus first infected humans or when the first influenza pandemic occurred. The first influenza epidemic may have occurred around 6,000 BC in China, and possible descriptions of influenza exist in Greek writings from the 5th century BC. In both 1173–1174 AD and 1387 AD, epidemics occurred across Europe that were named "influenza". Whether these epidemics or others were caused by influenza is unclear since there was then no consistent naming pattern for epidemic respiratory diseases, and "influenza" didn't become clearly associated with respiratory disease until centuries later. Influenza may have been brought to the Americas as early as 1493, when an epidemic disease resembling influenza killed most of the population of the Antilles.

The first convincing record of an influenza pandemic was chronicled in 1510. It began in East Asia before spreading to North Africa and then Europe. Following the pandemic, seasonal influenza occurred, with subsequent pandemics in 1557 and 1580. The flu pandemic in 1557 was potentially the first time influenza was connected to miscarriage and death of pregnant women. The 1580 flu pandemic originated in Asia during summer, spread to Africa, then Europe, and finally America. By the end of the 16th century, influenza was beginning to become understood as a specific, recognizable disease with epidemic and endemic forms. In 1648, it was discovered that horses also experience influenza.

Influenza data after 1700 is more accurate, so it is easier to identify flu pandemics after this point, each of which incrementally increased understanding of influenza. The first flu pandemic of the 18th century started in 1729 in Russia in spring, spreading worldwide over the course of three years with distinct waves, the later ones being more lethal. The second flu pandemic of the 18th century was in 1781–1782, starting in China in autumn. From this pandemic, influenza became associated with sudden outbreaks of febrile illness. The next flu pandemic was from 1830 to 1833, beginning in China in winter. This pandemic had a high attack rate, but the mortality rate was low.

A minor influenza pandemic occurred from 1847 to 1851 at the same time as the third cholera pandemic and was the first flu pandemic to occur with vital statistics being recorded, so influenza mortality was clearly recorded for the first time. Highly pathogenic avian influenza was recognized in 1878 and was soon linked to transmission to humans. By the time of the 1889 pandemic, which may have been caused by an H2N2 strain, the flu had become an easily recognizable disease.

The microbial agent responsible for influenza was incorrently identified in 1892 by R. F. J. Pfeiffer as the bacteria species Haemophilus influenzae, which retains "influenza" in its name. In succeeding years, the field of virology began to form as viruses were identified as the cause of many diseases. From 1901 to 1903, Italian and Austrian researchers were able to show that avian influenza, then called "fowl plague", was caused by a microscopic agent smaller than bacteria by using filters with pores too small for bacteria to pass through. The fundamental differences between viruses and bacteria, however, were not yet fully understood.

From 1918 to 1920, the Spanish flu pandemic became the most devastating influenza pandemic and one of the deadliest pandemics in history. The pandemic, probably caused by H1N1, likely began in the United States before spreading worldwide via soldiers during and after the First World War. The initial wave in the first half of 1918 was relatively minor and resembled past flu pandemics, but the second wave later that year had a much higher mortality rate, accounting for most deaths. A third wave with lower mortality occurred in many places a few months after the second. By the end of 1920, it is estimated that about a third to half of all people in the world had been infected, with tens of millions of deaths, disproportionately young adults. During the 1918 pandemic, the respiratory route of transmission was clearly identified and influenza was shown to be caused by a "filter passer", not a bacterium, but there remained a lack of agreement about influenza's cause for another decade and research on influenza declined. After the pandemic, H1N1 circulated in humans in seasonal form up until the next pandemic.

In 1931, Richard Shope published three papers identifying a virus as the cause of swine influenza, a then newly recognized disease among pigs that was characterized during the second wave of the 1918 pandemic. Shope's research reinvigorated research on human influenza, and many advances in virology, serology, immunology, experimental animal models, vaccinology, and immunotherapy have since arisen from influenza research. Just two years after influenza viruses were discovered, in 1933, IAV was identified as the agent responsible for human influenza. Subtypes of IAV were discovered throughout the 1930s, and IBV was discovered in 1940.

During the Second World War, the US government worked on developing inactivated vaccines for influenza, resulting in the first influenza vaccine being licensed in 1945 in the United States. ICV was discovered two years later in 1947. In 1955, avian influenza was confirmed to be caused by IAV. Four influenza pandemics have occurred since WWII, each less severe than the 1918 pandemic. The first of these was the Asian flu from 1957 to 1958, caused by an H2N2 strain and beginning in China's Yunnan province. The number of deaths probably exceeded one million, mostly among the very young and very old. The 1957 pandemic was the first flu pandemic to occur in the presence of a global surveillance system and laboratories able to study the novel influenza virus. After the pandemic, H2N2 was the IAV subtype responsible for seasonal influenza. The first antiviral drug against influenza, amantadine, was approved for use in 1966, with additional antiviral drugs being used since the 1990s.

In 1968, H3N2 was introduced into humans through a rearrangement between an avian H3N2 strain and an H2N2 strain that was circulating in humans. The novel H3N2 strain emerged in Hong Kong and spread worldwide, causing the Hong Kong flu pandemic, which resulted in 500,000–2,000,000 deaths. This was the first pandemic to spread significantly by air travel. H2N2 and H3N2 co-circulated after the pandemic until 1971 when H2N2 waned in prevalence and was completely replaced by H3N2. In 1977, H1N1 reemerged in humans, possibly after it was released from a freezer in a laboratory accident, and caused a pseudo-pandemic. Whether the 1977 "pandemic" deserves to be included in the natural history of flu pandemics is debatable. This H1N1 strain was antigenically similar to the H1N1 strains that circulated prior to 1957. Since 1977, both H1N1 and H3N2 have circulated in humans as part of seasonal influenza. In 1980, the classification system used to subtype influenza viruses was introduced.

At some point, IBV diverged into two strains, named the B/Victoria-like and B/Yamagata-like lineages, both of which have been circulating in humans since 1983. In 1996, HPAI H5N1 was detected in Guangdong, China and a year later emerged in poultry in Hong Kong, gradually spreading worldwide from there. A small H5N1 outbreak in humans in Hong Kong occurred then, and sporadic human cases have occurred since 1997, carrying a high case fatality rate. The most recent flu pandemic was the 2009 swine flu pandemic, which originated in Mexico and resulted in hundreds of thousands of deaths. It was caused by a novel H1N1 strain that was a reassortment of human, swine, and avian influenza viruses. The 2009 pandemic had the effect of replacing prior H1N1 strains in circulation with the novel strain but not any other influenza viruses. Consequently, H1N1, H3N2, and both IBV lineages have been in circulation in seasonal form since the 2009 pandemic.

In 2011, IDV was discovered in pigs in Oklahoma, USA, and cattle were later identified as the primary reservoir of IDV. In the same year, avian H7N9 was detected in China and began to cause human infections in 2013, starting in Shanghai and Anhui and remaining mostly in China. HPAI H7N9 emerged sometime in 2016 and has occasionally infected humans incidentally. Other AIVs have less commonly infected humans since the 1990s, including H5N6, H6N1, H7N2-4, H7N7, and H10N7-8, and HPAI H subtypes such as H5N1-3, H5N5-6, and H5N8 have begun to spread throughout much of the world since the 2010s. Future flu pandemics, which may be caused by an influenza virus of avian origin, are viewed as almost inevitable, and increased globalization has made it easier for novel viruses to spread, so there are continual efforts to prepare for future pandemics and improve the prevention and treatment of influenza.

Etymology
The word influenza comes from the Italian word influenza, from medieval Latin influentia, originally meaning "visitation" or "influence". Terms such as influenza di freddo, meaning "influence of the cold", and influenza di stelle, meaning "influence of the stars" are attested from the 14th century. The latter referred to the disease's cause, which at the time was ascribed by some to unfavorable astrological conditions. As early as 1504, influenza began to mean a "visitation" or "outbreak" of any disease affecting many people in a single place at once. During an outbreak of influenza in 1743 that started in Italy and spread throughout Europe, the word reached the English language and was anglicized in pronunciation. Since the mid-1800s, influenza has also been used to refer to severe colds. The shortened form of the word, "(the) flu", is first attested in 1839 as flue with the spelling flu confirmed in 1893. Other names that have been used for influenza include epidemic catarrh, la grippe from French, sweating sickness, and, especially when referring to the 1918 pandemic strain, Spanish fever.

Research

Influenza research is wide-ranging and includes efforts to understand how influenza viruses enter hosts, the relationship between influenza viruses and bacteria, how influenza symptoms progress, and what make some influenza viruses deadlier than others. Non-structural proteins encoded by influenza viruses are periodically discovered and their functions are continually under research. Past pandemics, and especially the 1918 pandemic, are the subject of much research to understand flu pandemics. As part of pandemic preparedness, the Global Influenza Surveillance and Response System is a global network of laboratories that monitors influenza transmission and epidemiology. Additional areas of research include ways to improve the diagnosis, treatment, and prevention of influenza.

Existing diagnostic methods have a variety of limitations coupled with their advantages. For example, NATs have high sensitivity and specificity but are impractical in under-resourced regions due to their high cost, complexity, maintenance, and training required. Low-cost, portable RIDTs can rapidly diagnose influenza but have highly variable sensitivity and are unable to subtype IAV. As a result of these limitations and others, research into new diagnostic methods revolves around producing new methods that are cost-effective, less labor-intensive, and less complex than existing methods while also being able to differentiate influenza species and IAV subtypes. One approach in development are lab-on-a-chips, which are diagnostic devices that make use of a variety of diagnostic tests, such as RT-PCR and serological assays, in microchip form. These chips have many potential advantages, including high reaction efficiency, low energy consumption, and low waste generation.

New antiviral drugs are also in development due to the elimination of adamantines as viable drugs and concerns over oseltamivir resistance. These include: NA inhibitors that can be injected intravenously, such as intravenous formulations of zanamivir; favipiravir, which is a polymerase inhibitor used against several RNA viruses; pimodivir, which prevents cap-binding required during viral transcription; and nitazoxanide, which inhibits HA maturation. Reducing excess inflammation in the respiratory tract is also subject to much research since this is one of the primary mechanisms of influenza pathology. Other forms of therapy in development include monoclonal and polyclonal antibodies that target viral proteins, convalescent plasma, different approaches to modify the host antiviral response, and stem cell-based therapies to repair lung damage.

Much research on LAIVs focuses on identifying genome sequences that can be deleted to create harmless influenza viruses in vaccines that still confer immunity. The high variability and rapid evolution of influenza virus antigens, however, is a major obstacle in developing effective vaccines. Furthermore, it is hard to predict which strains will be in circulation during the next flu season, manufacturing a sufficient quantity of flu vaccines for the next season is difficult, LAIVs have limited efficacy, and repeated annual vaccination potentially has diminished efficacy. For these reasons, "broadly-reactive" or "universal" flu vaccines are being researched that can provide protection against many or all influenza viruses. Approaches to develop such a vaccine include HA stalk-based methods such as chimeras that have the same stalk but different heads, HA head-based methods such as computationally optimized broadly neutralizing antigens, anti-idiotypic antibodies, and vaccines to elicit immune responses to highly conserved viral proteins. mRNA vaccines to provide protection against influenza are also under research.

In animals

Birds
Aquatic birds such as ducks, geese, shorebirds, and gulls are the primary reservoir of IAVs. In birds, AIVs may be either low pathogenic avian influenza (LPAI) viruses that produce little to no symptoms or highly pathogenic avian influenza (HPAI) viruses that cause severe illness. Symptoms of HPAI infection include lack of energy and appetite, decreased egg production, soft-shelled or misshapen eggs, swelling of the head, comb, wattles, and hocks, purple discoloration of wattles, combs, and legs, nasal discharge, coughing, sneezing, incoordination, and diarrhea. Birds infected with an HPAI virus may also die suddenly without any signs of infection.

The distinction between LPAI and HPAI can generally be made based on how lethal an AIV is to chickens. At the genetic level, an AIV can be usually be identified as an HPAI virus if it has a multibasic cleavage site in the HA protein, which contains additional residues in the HA gene. Most AIVs are LPAI. Notable HPAI viruses include HPAI H5N1 and HPAI H7N9. HPAI viruses have been a major disease burden in the 21st century, resulting in the death of large numbers of birds. In H7N9's case, some circulating strains were originally LPAI but became HPAI by acquiring the HA multibasic cleavage site. Avian H9N2 is also of concern because although it is LPAI, it is a common donor of genes to H5N1 and H7N9 during reassortment.

Migratory birds can spread influenza across long distances. An example of this was when an H5N1 strain in 2005 infected birds at Qinghai Lake, China, which is a stopover and breeding site for many migratory birds, subsequently spreading the virus to more than 20 countries across Asia, Europe, and the Middle East. AIVs can be transmitted from wild birds to domestic free-range ducks and in turn to poultry through contaminated water, aerosols, and fomites. Ducks therefore act as key intermediates between wild and domestic birds. Transmission to poultry typically occurs in backyard farming and live animal markets where multiple species interact with each other. From there, AIVs can spread to poultry farms in the absence of adequate biosecurity. Among poultry, HPAI transmission occurs through aerosols and contaminated feces, cages, feed, and dead animals. Back-transmission of HPAI viruses from poultry to wild birds has occurred and is implicated in mass die-offs and intercontinental spread.

AIVs have occasionally infected humans through aerosols, fomites, and contaminated water. Direction transmission from wild birds is rare. Instead, most transmission involves domestic poultry, mainly chickens, ducks, and geese but also a variety of other birds such as guinea fowl, partridge, pheasants, and quails. The primary risk factor for infection with AIVs is exposure to birds in farms and live poultry markets. Typically, infection with an AIV has an incubation period of 3–5 days but can be up to 9 days. H5N1 and H7N9 cause severe lower respiratory tract illness, whereas other AIVs such as H9N2 cause a more mild upper respiratory tract illness, commonly with conjunctivitis. Limited transmission of avian H2, H5-7, H9, and H10 subtypes from one person to another through respiratory droplets, aerosols, and fomites has occurred, but sustained human-to-human transmission of AIVs has not occurred. Before 2013, H5N1 was the most common AIV to infect humans. Since then, H7N9 has been responsible for most human cases.

Pigs

Influenza in pigs is a respiratory disease similar to influenza in humans and is found worldwide. Asymptomatic infections are common. Symptoms typically appear 1–3 days after infection and include fever, lethargy, anorexia, weight loss, labored breathing, coughing, sneezing, and nasal discharge. In sows, pregnancy may be aborted. Complications include secondary infections and potentially fatal bronchopneumonia. Pigs become contagious within a day of infection and typically spread the virus for 7–10 days, which can spread rapidly within a herd. Pigs usually recover from infection within 3–7 days after symptoms appear. Prevention and control measures include inactivated vaccines and culling infected herds. The influenza viruses usually responsible for swine flu are IAV subtypes H1N1, H1N2, and H3N2.

Some IAVs can be transmitted via aerosols from pigs to humans and vice versa. Furthermore, pigs, along with bats and quails, are recognized as a mixing vessel of influenza viruses because they have both α-2,3 and α-2,6 sialic acid receptors in their respiratory tract. Because of that, both avian and mammalian influenza viruses can infect pigs. If co-infection occurs, then reassortment is possible. A notable example of this was the reassortment of a swine, avian, and human influenza virus in 2009, resulting in a novel H1N1 strain that caused the 2009 flu pandemic. Spillover events from humans to pigs, however, appear to be more common than from pigs to humans.

Other animals
Influenza viruses have been found in many other animals, including cattle, horses, dogs, cats, and marine mammals. Nearly all IAVs are apparently descended from ancestral viruses in birds. The exception are bat influenza-like viruses, which have an uncertain origin. These bat viruses have HA and NA subtypes H17, H18, N10, and N11. H17N10 and H18N11 are unable to reassort with other IAVs, but they are still able to replicate in other mammals. AIVs sometimes crossover into mammals. For example, in late 2016 to early 2017, an avian H7N2 strain was found to be infecting cats in New York.

Equine IAVs include H7N7 and two lineages of H3N8. H7N7, however, has not been detected in horses since the late 1970s, so it may have become extinct in horses. H3N8 in equines spreads via aerosols and causes respiratory illness. Equine H3N8 perferentially binds to α-2,3 sialic acids, so horses are usually considered dead-end hosts, but transmission to dogs and camels has occurred, raising concerns that horses may be mixing vessels for reassortment. In canines, the only IAVs in circulation are equine-derived H3N8 and avian-derived H3N2. Canine H3N8 has not been observed to reassort with other subtypes. H3N2 has a much broader host range and can reassort with H1N1 and H5N1. An isolated case of H6N1 likely from a chicken was found infecting a dog, so other AIVs may emerge in canines.

Other mammals to be infected by IAVs include H7N7 and H4N5 in seals, H1N3 in whales, and H10N4 and H3N2 in minks. Various mutations have been identified that are associated with AIVs adapting to mammals. Since HA proteins vary in which sialic acids they bind to, mutations in the HA receptor binding site can allow AIVs to infect mammals. Other mutations include mutations affecting which sialic acids NA proteins cleave and a mutation in the PB2 polymerase subunit that improves tolerance of lower temperatures in mammalian respiratory tracts and enhances RNP assembly by stabilizing NP and PB2 binding.

IBV is mainly found in humans but has also been detected in pigs, dogs, horses, and seals. Likewise, ICV primarily infects humans but has been observed in pigs, dogs, cattle, and dromedary camels. IDV causes an influenza-like illness in pigs but its impact in its natural reservoir, cattle, is relatively unknown. It may cause respiratory disease resembling human influenza on its own, or it may be part of a bovine respiratory disease (BRD) complex with other pathogens during co-infection. BRD is a concern for the cattle industry, so IDV's possible involvement in BRD has led to research on vaccines for cattle that can provide protection against IDV. Two antigenic lineages are in circulation: D/swine/Oklahoma/1334/2011 (D/OK) and D/bovine/Oklahoma/660/2013 (D/660).

References

 
Airborne diseases
Animal viral diseases
Healthcare-associated infections
Vaccine-preventable diseases
Wikipedia emergency medicine articles ready to translate
Wikipedia medicine articles ready to translate
Zoonoses